McClennon is a surname. Notable people with the surname include:

George McClennon (died 1937), American jazz clarinetist, singer, and dancer
James McClennon (1900–1971), English footballer
Sheila McClennon (born 1960), British radio presenter

See also
McClendon
McGlennon